Carlos Asbun Zugbi (born 19 February 1926) is a Bolivian former sports shooter. He competed at the 1968 Summer Olympics and the 1972 Summer Olympics.

References

External links
 

1926 births
Possibly living people
Bolivian male sport shooters
Olympic shooters of Bolivia
Shooters at the 1968 Summer Olympics
Shooters at the 1972 Summer Olympics
Sportspeople from Cochabamba